Tony Sibson (born 9 April 1958, in Leicester, England) is a former professional boxer.

Boxing career
Tony Sibson was Commonwealth and European champion and a three-time world title challenger. His speed coupled with rugged power enabled him to be ranked as one of the best middleweights in the world and ultimately challenge Marvin Hagler for his world crown.

A Middleweight, Sibson fought during the 1970s and 1980s, winning 55 of his 63 bouts, including 31 by knockout. He fought Marvin Hagler for the WBA and WBC middleweight titles in February 1983, losing by a technical knockout in the sixth round. Sibson later moved up to Light heavyweight and lost to Dennis Andries in a bout for the WBC title in 1986. Two years later he challenged Frank Tate for the IBF Middleweight title, this time losing by a 10th-round TKO.

Professional boxing record

|-
|align="center" colspan=8|55 Wins (31 knockouts, 24 decisions), 7 Losses (5 knockouts, 2 decisions), 1 Draw 
|-
| align="center" style="border-style: none none solid solid; background: #e3e3e3"|Result
| align="center" style="border-style: none none solid solid; background: #e3e3e3"|Record
| align="center" style="border-style: none none solid solid; background: #e3e3e3"|Opponent
| align="center" style="border-style: none none solid solid; background: #e3e3e3"|Type
| align="center" style="border-style: none none solid solid; background: #e3e3e3"|Round
| align="center" style="border-style: none none solid solid; background: #e3e3e3"|Date
| align="center" style="border-style: none none solid solid; background: #e3e3e3"|Location
| align="center" style="border-style: none none solid solid; background: #e3e3e3"|Notes
|-align=center
|Loss
|
|align=left|Frank Tate
|TKO
|10
|7 February 1988
|align=left|Stafford, Staffordshire, United Kingdom
|align=left|
|-

|Win
|
|align=left|Brian Anderson
|TKO
|7
|16 September 1987
|align=left|Kensington, London, United Kingdom
|align=left|
|-
|Loss
|
|align=left|Dennis Andries
|TKO
|9
|10 September 1986
|align=left|Muswell Hill, London, United Kingdom
|align=left|
|-
|Win
|
|align=left|Luis Jose Rivera
|PTS
|10
|16 April 1986
|align=left|Holborn, London, United Kingdom
|align=left|
|-
|Win
|
|align=left|Abdul Umaru Sanda
|PTS
|12
|19 March 1986
|align=left|Muswell Hill, London, United Kingdom
|align=left|
|-
|Win
|
|align=left|Juan Elizondo
|KO
|2
|22 January 1986
|align=left|Muswell Hill, London, United Kingdom
|align=left|
|-
|Win
|
|align=left|Mark Kaylor
|UD
|12
|27 November 1984
|align=left|Wembley, London, United Kingdom
|align=left|
|-
|Win
|
|align=left|Louis Acaries
|PTS
|12
|25 February 1984
|align=left|Paris, France
|align=left|
|-
|Loss
|
|align=left|Don Lee
|TKO
|8
|15 January 1984
|align=left|Atlantic City, New Jersey, United States
|align=left|
|-
|Win
|
|align=left|Manuel Jiminez
|TKO
|8
|22 November 1983
|align=left|Wembley, London, United Kingdom
|align=left|
|-
|Win
|
|align=left|John Collins
|TKO
|2
|8 October 1983
|align=left|Atlantic City, New Jersey, United States
|align=left|
|-
|Loss
|
|align=left|Marvin Hagler
|TKO
|6
|11 February 1983
|align=left|Worcester, Massachusetts, United States
|align=left|
|-
|Win
|
|align=left|Antonio Alejandro Garrido
|RTD
|8
|14 September 1982
|align=left|Wembley, London, United Kingdom
|align=left|
|-
|Win
|
|align=left|Jacques Chinon
|TKO
|10
|4 May 1982
|align=left|Wembley, London, United Kingdom
|align=left|
|-
|Win
|
|align=left|Dwight Davison
|PTS
|12
|21 February 1982
|align=left|Birmingham, West Midlands, United Kingdom
|align=left|
|-
|Win
|
|align=left|Nicola Cirelli
|KO
|10
|24 November 1981
|align=left|Wembley, London, United Kingdom
|align=left|
|-
|Win
|
|align=left|Alan Minter
|TKO
|3
|15 September 1981
|align=left|Wembley, London, United Kingdom
|align=left|
|-
|Win
|
|align=left|Andoni Amana
|PTS
|12
|14 May 1981
|align=left|Bilbao, Pais Vasco, Spain
|align=left|
|-
|Win
|
|align=left|Andre Mongelema
|PTS
|10
|17 March 1981
|align=left|Wembley, London, United Kingdom
|align=left|
|-
|Win
|
|align=left|Norberto Cabrera
|PTS
|10
|27 January 1981
|align=left|Kensington, London, United Kingdom
|align=left|
|-
|Win
|
|align=left|Matteo Salvemini
|KO
|7
|8 December 1980
|align=left|Kensington, London, United Kingdom
|align=left|
|-
|Win
|
|align=left|Bobby Coolidge
|KO
|7
|27 September 1980
|align=left|Wembley, London, United Kingdom
|align=left|
|-
|Win
|
|align=left|Marciano Bernardi
|PTS
|10
|3 June 1980
|align=left|Kensington, London, United Kingdom
|align=left|
|-
|Win
|
|align=left|Chisanda Mutti
|PTS
|15
|4 March 1980
|align=left|Wembley, London, United Kingdom
|align=left|
|-
|Win
|
|align=left|James Waire
|PTS
|10
|22 January 1980
|align=left|Kensington, London, United Kingdom
|align=left|
|-
|Win
|
|align=left|Robert Powell
|TKO
|1
|29 November 1979
|align=left|Liverpool, United Kingdom
|align=left|
|-
|Loss
|
|align=left|Kevin Finnegan
|PTS
|15
|6 November 1979
|align=left|Kensington, London, United Kingdom
|align=left|
|-
|Win
|
|align=left|Willie Classen
|KO
|2
|9 October 1979
|align=left|Kensington, London, United Kingdom
|align=left|
|-
|Win
|
|align=left|Jacques Chinon
|TKO
|8
|26 June 1979
|align=left|Leicester, Leicestershire, United Kingdom
|align=left|
|-
|Win
|
|align=left|Al Clay
|TKO
|7
|15 May 1979
|align=left|Wembley, London, United Kingdom
|align=left|
|-
|Win
|
|align=left|Frankie Lucas
|TKO
|5
|10 April 1979
|align=left|Kensington, London, United Kingdom
|align=left|
|-
|Win
|
|align=left|Eddie Smith
|PTS
|10
|5 March 1979
|align=left|Wolverhampton, West Midlands, United Kingdom
|align=left|
|-
|Win
|
|align=left|Gerard Nosley
|TKO
|7
|7 November 1978
|align=left|Wembley, London, United Kingdom
|align=left|
|-
|Loss
|
|align=left|Eddie Smith
|PTS
|8
|24 October 1978
|align=left|Kensington, London, United Kingdom
|align=left|
|-
|Win
|
|align=left|Keith Bussey
|TKO
|8
|12 September 1978
|align=left|Wembley, London, United Kingdom
|align=left|
|-
|Win
|
|align=left|Bonny McKenzie
|PTS
|8
|18 July 1978
|align=left|Wakefield, Yorkshire, United Kingdom
|align=left|
|-
|Win
|
|align=left|Danny McLoughlin
|KO
|3
|29 June 1978
|align=left|Wolverhampton, West Midlands, United Kingdom
|align=left|
|-
|Loss
|
|align=left|Lottie Mwale
|KO
|1
|23 May 1978
|align=left|Leicester, Leicestershire, United Kingdom
|align=left|
|-
|Win
|
|align=left|Mac Nicholson
|TKO
|1
|25 April 1978
|align=left|Kensington, London, United Kingdom
|align=left|
|-
|Win
|
|align=left|Steve Walker
|TKO
|5
|4 April 1978
|align=left|Wolverhampton, West Midlands, United Kingdom
|align=left|
|-
|Win
|
|align=left|Mac Nicholson
|TKO
|7
|31 March 1978
|align=left|Liverpool, United Kingdom
|align=left|
|-
|Win
|
|align=left|Errol McKenzie
|KO
|2
|6 March 1978
|align=left|Wolverhampton, West Midlands, United Kingdom
|align=left|
|-
|Win
|
|align=left|John Smith
|KO
|5
|23 January 1978
|align=left|Wolverhampton, West Midlands, United Kingdom
|align=left|
|-
|Win
|
|align=left|Oscar Angus
|TKO
|6
|30 November 1977
|align=left|Wolverhampton, West Midlands, United Kingdom
|align=left|
|-
|Win
|
|align=left|Wayne Bennett
|PTS
|8
|8 November 1977
|align=left|West Bromwich, West Midlands, United Kingdom
|align=left|
|-
|Draw
|
|align=left|Pat Thomas
|PTS
|8
|18 October 1977
|align=left|Wolverhampton, West Midlands, United Kingdom
|align=left|
|-
|Win
|
|align=left|Sonny Kamunga
|PTS
|8
|27 April 1977
|align=left|Leicester, Leicestershire, United Kingdom
|align=left|
|-
|Win
|
|align=left|Tony Burnett
|PTS
|8
|21 April 1977
|align=left|Liverpool, United Kingdom
|align=left|
|-
|Win
|
|align=left|Steve Walker
|PTS
|8
|7 April 1977
|align=left|Dudley, West Midlands, United Kingdom
|align=left|
|-
|Win
|
|align=left|Bonny McKenzie
|KO
|7
|24 March 1977
|align=left|Leicester, Leicestershire, United Kingdom
|align=left|
|-
|Win
|
|align=left|Gareth Jones
|KO
|1
|25 February 1977
|align=left|Birmingham, West Midlands, United Kingdom
|align=left|
|-
|Win
|
|align=left|Arthur Winfield
|TKO
|2
|10 February 1977
|align=left|Coventry, West Midlands, United Kingdom
|align=left|
|-
|Win
|
|align=left|Roy Gumbs
|PTS
|8
|19 January 1977
|align=left|Solihull, West Midlands, United Kingdom
|align=left|
|-
|Win
|
|align=left|Tony Burnett
|PTS
|8
|11 January 1977
|align=left|Wolverhampton, West Midlands, United Kingdom
|align=left|
|-
|Win
|
|align=left|Tim McHugh
|TKO
|4
|14 December 1976
|align=left|West Bromwich, West Midlands, United Kingdom
|align=left|
|-
|Win
|
|align=left|John Breen
|TKO
|5
|30 November 1976
|align=left|Dudley, West Midlands, United Kingdom
|align=left|
|-
|Win
|
|align=left|Neville Esteban
|PTS
|8
|3 November 1976
|align=left|Caister-on-Sea, Norfolk, United Kingdom
|align=left|
|-
|Win
|
|align=left|Clive Davidson
|PTS
|8
|22 October 1976
|align=left|Birmingham, West Midlands, United Kingdom
|align=left|
|-
|Win
|
|align=left|Bonny McKenzie
|TKO
|7
|10 September 1976
|align=left|Birmingham, West Midlands, United Kingdom
|align=left|
|-
|Win
|
|align=left|Jimmy Pickard
|PTS
|6
|14 July 1976
|align=left|Wolverhampton, West Midlands, United Kingdom
|align=left|
|-
|Win
|
|align=left|Liam White
|PTS
|6
|26 May 1976
|align=left|Wolverhampton, West Midlands, United Kingdom
|align=left|
|-
|Win
|
|align=left|John Breen
|PTS
|6
|6 May 1976
|align=left|Birmingham, West Midlands, United Kingdom
|align=left|
|-
|Win
|
|align=left|Charlie Ricardson
|TKO
|2
|9 April 1976
|align=left|Birmingham, West Midlands, United Kingdom
|align=left|
|}

Post-Boxing career
Since retiring from boxing, Sibson has led a low-key life working within the building trade living in Leicester.

See also
 List of British middleweight boxing champions

External links
 

1958 births
Living people
English male boxers
Light-heavyweight boxers
Middleweight boxers
Boxers from Leicester